Tobias Grøndahl (born 22 January 2001) is a Norwegian handball player for Elverum Håndball and the Norwegian national team.

He participated at the 2023 World Men's Handball Championship.

Individual awards 

 EHF Champions League All-Star Team as Best Young Player: 2022

References

External links

2001 births
Living people
Norwegian male handball players
Sportspeople from Bærum